The Census in Pakistan, is a decennial census and a descriptive count of Pakistan's population on Census Day, and of their dwellings, conducted and supervised by the Pakistan Bureau of Statistics. The 2017 Census in Pakistan marks the first census to take place in Pakistan since 1998. The next census will take place in March 2023

Overview
A national census is mandated by the Constitution of Pakistan to be held every ten years. After the independence of Pakistan in 1947, the first census took place in 1951 under Finance Minister Sir Malik Ghulam, serving under Prime Minister Liaquat Ali Khan. Since 1951, there have been only 6 nationwide censuses (1961, 1972, 1981, 1998 and 2017). Delays and postponements have often been due to politicization. Pakistan's last completed census took place in 2017. The next national census was scheduled to take place in 2001 and later 2008, and again in 2010, but none of those plans could materialize. There were multiple census counts completed for the latest round in April 2012, but were subsequently thrown out as being "unreliable". A UN led census was to be conducted with staff training and GPS digitisation. As of 2015, the population of Pakistan is estimated at 191.71 million. As of 2016, the population of religious minorities in Pakistan have increased to 3 million. On 25 August 2017, the official results declared Pakistan's population to be 207.74 million.

.

Census

1951
According to 1951 census, the Dominion of Pakistan (both West and East Pakistan) had a population of 75.7 million, in which West Pakistan had a population of 33.7 million and East Pakistan (today Bangladesh) had a population of 42 million. In 1951, minorities constituted 14.4% of the Pakistani population (this includes East Pakistan, today Bangladesh).  Breaking down between East and West Pakistan, the population of West Pakistan was 3.44% non-Muslim (1.16 million out of 33.7 million), while East Pakistan (today Bangladesh) was 23.20% non-Muslim (9.744 million out of 42 million). Total non- Muslim population on both sides added up to 10.90 million.

1961
According to the 1961 census, the population of Pakistan was 93 million, with 42.8 million residing in West Pakistan and 50 million residing in East Pakistan. The literacy was 19.2%, in which East Pakistan had a literacy rate of 21.5% while West Pakistan had a literacy rate of 16.9%. Hindus in East Pakistan were 18.4%

1972
The scheduled 1971 census was postponed due to the political crisis of 1970 followed by the India-Pakistan war of 1971 and subsequent loss of East Pakistan. In 1970, the population was 65 million in the East Pakistan(Bangladesh) and 58 million in West Pakistan.

According to the 1972 census, the population of Pakistan was 65.3 million. After 1972, the Census Organization was merged into the Ministry of Interior.

1981
According to the 1981 census, the population of Pakistan was 83.783 million.

1998

2017

2023

Notes

0193 

Demographics of Pakistan